The 1948 Portland Pilots football team was an American football team that represented the University of Portland as an independent during the 1948 college football season. In its third and final year under head coach Hal Moe, the team compiled a 2–5–1 record. The team played its home games at Multnomah Stadium in Portland, Oregon.

Key players included quarterback Danny Christianson, left halfback John Freeman, right halfback Larry Wissbaum, and ends Joe Marshello, Ray Utz, and Bill Connell.

Schedule

References

Portland
Portland Pilots football seasons
Portland Pilots football
Portland Pilots football